Starkeya novella is a  chemolithoautotrophic and  methylotrophic bacteria from the family Xanthobacteraceae which has been isolated from soil. Starkeya novella has the ability to oxidise thiosulfate. The complete genome of Starkeya novella'' is sequenced.

References

Further reading

External links
Type strain of Starkeya novella at BacDive -  the Bacterial Diversity Metadatabase	

Hyphomicrobiales
Bacteria described in 2000